Ozarkcollenia is an extinct genus of stromatolite-making cyanobacteria from Missouri, United States. It was related to Collenia. Ozarkcollenia may have formed in a lake of volcanic origin. The fossils of Ozarkcollenia laminata have been dated to the Proterozoic eon, about 1.5 billion years ago. It occurs in parts of Missouri's Ozark Mountains.

References 

Cyanobacteria genera
Stromatolites